STAPL (Standard Template Adaptive Parallel Library) is a library for C++, similar and compatible to STL. It provides parallelism support for writing applications for systems with shared or distributed memory.

It was developed by Lawrence Rauchwerger, Nancy M. Amato, Bjarne Stroustrup and several grad students at Texas A&M University.

Components
 Components for Program Development
 pContainers - generic, distributed data structures with parallel methods.
 Views - equivalent of STL iterators, extended to allow efficient parallelism.
 pRange - a parallel task dependence graph recursively defined as a tree of subranges.
 pAlgorithms - parallel equivalents of STL algorithms.
 Run-time System(RTS) providing the following facilities:
 Adaptive Remote Method Invocation (ARMI)
 Framework for Algorithm Selection and Tuning(FAST)

See also
 Parallel computing
 List of C++ template libraries
 Threading Building Blocks (TBB)

References
L. Rauchwerger, F. Arzu, Koji Ouchi. "Standard Templates Adaptive Parallel Library"

External links
Stapl Website
Geekedu Website

Concurrent programming libraries
C++ libraries
Threads (computing)